The Orchid Graphics Adapter is a graphics board for IBM PC compatible computers, released in 1982 by Orchid Technology.

It was intended to provide high resolution (at the time) monochrome graphic abilities to computers limited to text displays. It was aimed at the business market and one of the three first third party graphic boards for PCs (the others being Plantronics Colorplus and Hercules Graphics Card).

It offered a monochrome 720x350 pixel resolution and required an existing MDA board to function. The board also offered an IBM PC joystick adapter. No software, other than GSX-86 and that supplied with the board (Dr. Halo by Media Cybernetics), offered support for the hardware. Graphic routines could be called from FORTRAN, PASCAL or IBM BASIC.

Output capabilities
720×350 monochrome graphics, pixel aspect ratio of 1:1.55.

See also
Plantronics Colorplus
Hercules Graphics Card
IBM Monochrome Display Adapter

References

Computer display standards
Graphics cards
Monochrome Display Adapter
Computer-related introductions in 1982